Christine Lynn Michael Sr. (born November 9, 1990) is a former American football running back. He played college football at Texas A&M, and was drafted by the Seattle Seahawks in the second round of the 2013 NFL Draft.

Early years
A native of Beaumont, Texas, Michael attended West Brook Senior High School in Beaumont, and played high school football for the West Brook Bruins.  He rushed for 4,234 yards on 501 carries. He was also named the District 21-5A Offensive MVP as a junior in 2007.  He won the 2009 Walter Payton Trophy for the best high school football athlete. He participated in the 2009 U.S. Army All-American Bowl, and was a finalist for the 2008 Hall Trophy for the best player in the nation.

Michael was also on the West Brook Senior High School track team, where he competed as a sprinter. He was timed at 11.02 seconds in the 100 meters as a junior. He was also a member of the 4 × 100m (42.00) and 4 × 200m (1:28.45) relay squads.

Considered a five-star recruit by Rivals.com, Michael was listed the third best running back prospect in the nation (behind Hall Trophy winner and fellow US Army All-American Bryce Brown and Alabama's Trent Richardson).

College career
Michael accepted an athletic scholarship to attend Texas A&M University, where he played for the Texas A&M Aggies football team from 2009 to 2012.  In 2009, after posting 844 total rushing yards on 166 carries, Michael received Offensive Freshman of the Year honors from the Big 12 Conference.

Michael underwent season-ending surgery during the 2010 season due to a cracked right tibia. He compiled 631 total yards for four touchdowns.

Professional career

Seattle Seahawks
Michael was selected in the second round (62nd overall) by the Seattle Seahawks in the 2013 NFL Draft. During his first two seasons, Michael saw limited action as the third running back behind Pro-Bowl veteran Marshawn Lynch and backup Robert Turbin. The Seahawks won Super Bowl XLVIII over the Denver Broncos and made an appearance in Super Bowl XLIX against the New England Patriots during that time. Michael was traded to the Dallas Cowboys on September 6, 2015, after the Seahawks signed veteran Fred Jackson. In exchange for Michael, the Seahawks received a conditional seventh-round draft pick (number 225, Devin Lucien).

Dallas Cowboys
Michael was acquired to help improve their depth at running back with the departure of DeMarco Murray via free agency. After being inactive the first three weeks, it was rumored during the Cowboys bye week that the coaching staff would possibly name him the starter. Instead Michael played in five games as a backup. On November 17, 2015, he was waived to make room for former Seahawks teammate Robert Turbin.

Washington Redskins
On November 19, 2015, Michael was signed to the Washington Redskins practice squad. He was released by the team on December 15, 2015.

Seattle Seahawks (second stint)
On December 16, 2015, the Seattle Seahawks signed Michael after injuries to Marshawn Lynch and Thomas Rawls. In his first game back with the Seahawks, Michael rushed for a career-high 84 yards against the Cleveland Browns. Michael rushed a new career-high of 102 rushing yards, including a 45-yard run, against the Arizona Cardinals two weeks later.

Michael received his first start in a playoff game in Seattle's Wild Card match up against the Minnesota Vikings and finished the 10–9 victory with 70 rushing yards and 14 receiving yards.

On March 17, 2016, Michael signed a one-year contract with the Seattle Seahawks.

In Week 3 of the 2016 season, Michael had a then career game after rushing for 106 yards and two touchdowns against the San Francisco 49ers.

On November 15, 2016, the Seahawks released Michael, despite being their starting running back for seven games and leading the team in rushing yards and attempts. After much speculation, head coach Pete Carroll cited that his release was due to the return of Thomas Rawls and the emergence of rookie running back C. J. Prosise alongside Michael's significant reduction in effectiveness on the field.

Green Bay Packers
Michael was claimed off waivers by the Green Bay Packers on November 16, 2016.

On March 23, 2017, Michael re-signed with the Packers on a one-year deal worth $800,000. On May 1, 2017, Michael was released by the Packers after the team drafted three running backs in the 2017 NFL Draft.

Indianapolis Colts
On June 1, 2017, Michael signed with the Indianapolis Colts. He was placed on injured reserve on June 15, 2017.

On March 21, 2018, Michael re-signed with the Colts. He was released on September 24, 2018.

St. Louis BattleHawks
In October 2019, Michael was drafted by the St. Louis BattleHawks in the 2020 XFL Draft. In March, amid the COVID-19 pandemic, the league announced that it would be cancelling the rest of the season. Playing in all 5 games, he had 59 rushes for 178 yards and a touchdown. He had his contract terminated when the league suspended operations on April 10, 2020.

NFL career statistics

Regular season

Postseason

Personal life
Michael's first name, which is unusual for a male, is pronounced KRIS-tin . His mother told him she wanted her first child to be a girl, so she chose the name before she knew the baby's gender; she likened the name to the character in the Johnny Cash song "A Boy Named Sue." In May 2016, he fathered a son named Christine Michael, Jr. and has since started wearing "Michael Sr." on the back of his practice and game jerseys.

References

External links

Texas A&M Aggies bio (archived)
Seattle Seahawks bio (archived)

1990 births
Living people
Sportspeople from Beaumont, Texas
Players of American football from Texas
American football running backs
Texas A&M Aggies football players
Seattle Seahawks players
Dallas Cowboys players
Washington Redskins players
Green Bay Packers players
Indianapolis Colts players
St. Louis BattleHawks players